The 2010–11 CAA men's basketball season marks the 26th season of Colonial Athletic Association basketball.

Preseason

CAA preseason poll

CAA preseason teams

Conference awards & honors

CAA All-Conference teams

References